Lin Yung-hsi (born 26 March 1979) is a Taiwanese gymnast. He competed at the 2000 Summer Olympics.

References

External links
 

1979 births
Living people
Taiwanese male artistic gymnasts
Olympic gymnasts of Taiwan
Gymnasts at the 2000 Summer Olympics
Place of birth missing (living people)
Medalists at the 2002 Asian Games
21st-century Taiwanese people